116903 Jeromeapt – provisional designation  – is an asteroid of the Massalia family from the inner regions of the asteroid belt, approximately  in diameter. It was discovered on 11 April 2004, by American astronomer Jim Young at the Table Mountain Observatory near Wrightwood, California, in the United States. The asteroid was named for American astronaut Jerome Apt.

Orbit and classification 

Jeromeapt is a member of the Massalia family, a large family of stony S-type asteroids with low inclinations. It orbits the sun in the inner main belt at a distance of 2.0–2.9 AU once every 3 years and 10 months (1,400 days; semi-major axis of 2.45 AU). Its orbit has an eccentricity of 0.17 and an inclination of 2° with respect to the ecliptic. The asteroid's observation arc begins more than 2 years prior to its official discovery observation, with a precovery taken by Spacewatch at the Steward Observatory in February 2002.

Naming 

This minor planet was named in honor of American Jerome Apt (born 1949), who was the discovering observatory's director and also an astronaut on four Space Shuttle missions in the 1990s. At the time of naming this asteroid, he was a professor at Carnegie Mellon University. The official  was published by the Minor Planet Center 29 October 2012.

Physical characteristics 

Since Massalia asteroids are of silicaceous rather than carbonaceous composition, with an albedo typically around 0.22 (also see list of families), Jeromeapt possibly measures 1.1 kilometer in diameter, based on an absolute magnitude of 17.1. As of 2018, the asteroid's effective size, its composition and albedo, as well as its rotation period and shape remain unknown.

References

External links 
 Asteroid Lightcurve Database (LCDB), query form (info )
 Dictionary of Minor Planet Names, Google books
 Discovery Circumstances: Numbered Minor Planets (115001)-(120000) – Minor Planet Center
 
 

116903
Discoveries by James Whitney Young
Named minor planets
20040411